Ernst Huberty (22 February 1927 in Trier) is a German sports journalist.

Life 
Since 1957, Huberty worked for German broadcaster WDR. Huberty moderated German Sportschau on German broadcaster ARD. 
In Germany he became famous for his words during footballplay in Mexico City on 17 June 1970: ("ausgerechnet Schnellinger ...", "Müller...Müller...Müller...Tor!" und "Wenn Sie jemals ein echtes Müller-Tor gesehen haben, dann jetzt"). Huberty is married and lives in Frechen, Cologne

References 

German journalists
German sports journalists
German sports broadcasters
German male journalists
20th-century German journalists
21st-century German journalists
1927 births
Living people
German male writers
ARD (broadcaster) people
Westdeutscher Rundfunk people